Maine Central Railroad Class H locomotives were intended for branch line passenger service.  They were of 4-4-0 wheel arrangement in the Whyte notation, or "2'B" in UIC classification . Built by the American Locomotive Company's (ALCO) Manchester in 1898 the last were completed at ALCO's Schenectady, New York plant in 1898 all were scrapped between 1916 and 1921 . None of the Maine Central Class H 4-4-0 were preserved .

References 

Steam locomotives of the United States
4-4-0 locomotives
ALCO locomotives
H
Railway locomotives introduced in 1905
Standard gauge locomotives of the United States